Brikama is one of the largest cities in the Gambia. It is also called 'Satey Ba' by the locals, meaning "big town". It lies southwest of the country's capital, Banjul. Brikama is the headquarters of the Brikama Local Government Area (formerly the Western Division), and is the largest city in the region containing over twenty five wards with a population of over 100,000. As per the 2013 census, the population of Brikama LGA is 730,895.

Brikama is known for wood carving. It is the center of the Gambian music industry with many famous musicians coming from Brikama. Local attractions include the Makasutu Culture Forest, craft market.

Brikama is home to numerous educational institutions including The Gambia College, which trains the nation's teachers, and the Regional Education Office for the Western Region of the country.  In addition, there are several secondary schools (Kinderdorf Bottrop, Kabafita junior and senior secondary, Kunte Kinte, St. Vincent, Maahad, and Methodist Academy), as well as a number of basic cycle schools and Islamic schools.

Brikama has its own football club, the Brikama United Football Club.

References

External links 
 
 
 Brikama Accommodation, Photos & Information

West Coast Division (The Gambia)
Populated places in the Gambia
Local Government Areas of the Gambia